Kitty Kelly (born Sue O'Neil; April 27, 1902 – June 29, 1968), was an American stage and film character actress.

Biography
Born in New York City in 1902, Kelly was best known as a member of the Ziegfeld Follies and her radio hosting with Columbia Broadcasting. One of her best-remembered roles is that of Lt. Ethel Armstrong in the 1943 Paramount wartime drama So Proudly We Hail!. However, she is probably better remembered in the 1935 Our Gang comedy short Beginner's Luck.

After the war, she appeared in many TV series, including Bonanza, Alfred Hitchcock Presents, Batman and Perry Mason, on which she made four guest appearances, including the role of Millie Foster in the 1958 episode "The Case of the Rolling Bones."

Kelly also performed in England.

Death
Kelly died from cancer on June 29, 1968, in Hollywood, California.

Partial filmography

 A Kiss in the Dark (1925) - Chorus Girl
 La Nuit est à nous (1930) - Maud Sarazin
 Hot Bridge (1930, Short)
 Behind Office Doors (1931) - Delores Kogan
 Bachelor Apartment (1931) - Miss Clark, First Girl in Ladies Room
 White Shoulders (1931) - Maria Fontaine
 Men of Chance (1931) - Gertie Robbins
 Ladies of the Jury (1932) - Mayme Mixter
 Girl Crazy (1932) - Kate Foster
 The Girl in 419 (1933) - Kitty - Telephone Girl
 Headline Shooter (1933) - Sue, Burnett's New Moll (uncredited)
 Too Much Harmony (1933) - Patsy Dugan
 All of Me (1934) - Lorraine
 A Woman's Man (1934) - Molly Evans
 She Was a Lady (1934) - Daisy
 The Lemon Drop Kid (1934) - Cora Jennings
 Beginner's Luck (1935, Short) - Spanky's mother
 Dizzy Dames (1935) - La Vere
 The Farmer Takes a Wife (1935) - Ivy
 The Private Secretary (1935)
 The Man Behind the Mask (1936) - Marian Weeks
 Rhythm in the Air (1936) - Celia
 Blossoms on Broadway (1937) - Death Valley Cora Keane
 Men with Wings (1938) - Martha Ranson
 Grand Jury Secrets (1939) - Miss Clark
 Geronimo (1939) - Daisy Devine
 All Women Have Secrets (1939) - Flo
 Road to Singapore (1940) - Sailor's Wife (uncredited)
 Women Without Names (1940) - Countess
 Those Were the Days! (1940) - Mrs. Sanford (uncredited)
 The Mad Doctor (1941) - Winnie
 Hold Back the Dawn (1941) - American Lady at Bullfight (uncredited)
 The Lady Is Willing (1942) - Nellie Quigg
 Larceny, Inc. (1942) - Fourth customer (uncredited)
 They All Kissed the Bride (1942) - Spotter (uncredited)
 Holiday Inn (1942) - Drunk (uncredited)
 Lucky Jordan (1942) - Vera Maggotti
 So Proudly We Hail! (1943) - Lt. Ethel Armstrong
 Swing Out the Blues (1943) - Queenie (uncredited)
 Practically Yours (1944) - Wife - newsreel theater (uncredited)
 Two Years Before the Mast (1946) - Girl in Pub (uncredited)
 The Birds and the Bees (1956) - (uncredited)
 Gunsight Ridge (1957) - Mrs. Donahue
 Official Detective (1957, TV Series) - Mrs. Johnson (uncredited)
 The Lost Missile (1958) - Mama - Ella's Mother
 Twelve Hours to Kill (1960) - Train Passenger
 Mary, Mary (1963) - Wife in Elevator (uncredited)
 The Lieutenant (1964, Episode: "Gone the Sun") - Housekeeper
 The Third Day (1965) - Secretary (uncredited)
 Get Smart (1965, Episode: "School Days") - The Woman
 Firecreek (1968) - Mrs. Sawyer (uncredited) (final film role)

References

External links

American musical theatre actresses
American film actresses
American television actresses
Actresses from New York (state)
Deaths from cancer in California
Ziegfeld girls
1902 births
1968 deaths
20th-century American actresses
20th-century American singers
20th-century American women singers